Nosra Vakil Monfard (born 19 January 1947) is an Iranian boxer. He competed in the men's light welterweight event at the 1972 Summer Olympics. At the 1972 Summer Olympics, he lost to Jim Montague of Ireland, and finished in 17th place.

References

1947 births
Living people
Iranian male boxers
Olympic boxers of Iran
Boxers at the 1972 Summer Olympics
Place of birth missing (living people)
Light-welterweight boxers
20th-century Iranian people